Ünal Demirkıran (born 24 June 1979) is a German-Turkish footballer who plays as a midfielder for TSV Neu-Ulm, where he is also the manager.

Career
Demirkıran made his Bundesliga debut for SSV Ulm on 25 September 1999, coming on as a substitute in the 87th minute for Oliver Unsöld in the 2–2 away draw against Werder Bremen.

References

External links
 Profile at DFB.de
 Profile at kicker.de
 

1979 births
Living people
People from Neu-Ulm
Sportspeople from Swabia (Bavaria)
Footballers from Bavaria
German footballers
Turkish footballers
German people of Turkish descent
Association football midfielders
SSV Ulm 1846 players
VfR Aalen players
Sivasspor footballers
SSV Reutlingen 05 players
1. FC Heidenheim players
FV Illertissen players
TSG Thannhausen players
Bundesliga players
2. Bundesliga players
3. Liga players
Regionalliga players
Süper Lig players